Elmo's ABCs is a 1999 educational Game Boy Color video game. It was released in March 1999 in North America. Like Elmo's 123s, it was also released on April 6, 2001 in Europe.

The game was made by NewKidCo.

Plot
The player must help Elmo with the letters by pressing the "A" button on the Game Boy Color, which can put a letter in a slot. Elmo can go faster, so the player would need to press faster. There are six stages.

See also
Sesame Street video games

References

1999 video games
Children's educational video games
Game Boy Color games
Game Boy Color-only games
Sesame Street video games
Video games developed in the United States
NewKidCo games
Single-player video games